The 2016 MENA Golf Tour was the sixth season of the MENA Golf Tour. Official World Golf Ranking points were introduced for MENA Golf Tour events during the season. The Ras Al Khaimah Classic was the first event to receive ranking points.

Schedule
The following table lists official events during the 2016 season.

Order of Merit
The Order of Merit was based on prize money won during the season, calculated using a points-based system. The top five players on the tour earned status to play on the 2017–18 Sunshine Tour. Rayhan Thomas led the amateur Order of Merit.

Notes

References

MENA Golf Tour